In the field of vehicles authorized to drive, a one-off vehicle is a vehicle that was manufactured only once. The production of unique vehicles is reduced to one unit in each case.
The easiest cases to analyze are those of cars and motorcycles. Unique automobiles and unique motorcycles are usually kept and displayed in museums. Aeronautical vehicles, with notable exceptions, are not preserved in the same way (due to accidents and disappearances). Naval vehicles feature a myriad of unique models. A non-exclusive base of examples could be the field of sailing and motor yachts.

Some cases of non-legalized vehicles may be included in this article if they have particularly noticeable characteristics (engine, chassis, body, etc..).

Origin of one-off
A one-off is something made or occurring only once, independent of any pattern. First used in 1934, this term is employed to differentiate singular items from those in a series: e.g. "the Lincoln Futura was a one-off". It has been suggested that it is a misspelling of "one-of", but this etymology is not supported by sources such as the Oxford English Dictionary.

Cars 
Before mass production, automobiles were handcrafted. First the whole car and then only the body on a factory-provided chassis. There are many unique specimens of that time. Many customers made the car custom-made. Of that mass of unique cars it is only good to expose a few. Those that, besides being in a museum, have some remarkable features.

Alfa Romeo 40-60 HP Castagna 

The house  A.L.F.A. Manufactured a 40/60 designated street car. Designed by engineer Giuseppe Merosi, it had a 4-cylinder in-line engine (with camshaft and cylinder head) and provided 70 hp (52 kW) with a top speed of 125 km / h. In the racing version, the power reached 73 hp (54 kW) and a speed of 137 km / h.

In 1914 the Milanese count Marco Ricotti commissioned an aerodynamic body to the  specialized firm Castagna that allowed the speed of 140 km / h. This unique model was officially called "aerodynamics" and popularly was " Siluro Ricotti."

1922.  Doble steam cars
From 1922 the Double brothers built the C, D, R and F. Series models. Virtually every unit was unique, with significant changes to the chassis, boiler, engine and body.

1924. Hispano Suiza "Tulipwood" 

The extraordinary and well-honored Dubonnet (the heir to the snack maker Dubonnet) commissioned a racing car in Hispano Switzerland based on the Boulogne model. The bodywork was commissioned to Nieuport, an aircraft manufacturer.
 Engine: 6 cylinders in line, 8 liters, 200 hp
 Chassis
 Bodywork: From Virginia tulip strips of wood tucked in with brass nails (some talking about rivets) on wooden notebooks. There are doubts about some technical details. There are sources that speak of the structural elements of fir. Other authors indicate an aluminum sub-body. The total weight would be 78 kg. 

Despite the luxurious appearance it was a race car. It was sixth on the Targa Florio and the fifth on the Florio Cup.

1927. Bugatti Type 41 Royale

1931. Hispano-Suiza J12. 
This luxury car was stripped naked, with only the chassis and engine. All J12s were unique. The engine was V12 at 60 degrees. The engine block was machined from a 313 kg casting block. The crankshaft rotated on seven bearings. Each cylinder had two valves operated by rockers from a central camshaft. According to the designer, Mark Birkit, this solution (apparently less sophisticated than the camshafts in the cilinde head) was chosen as less noisy.
 The Hispano-Suiza J12 appears in the film Borsalino & Co

1938. Hispano-Suiza H6B Dubonnet Xenia

1938. Phantom Corsair 

The Phantom Corsair was built as a two-door sedan) for six passengers. A futuristic body was mounted on a Cord 810 chassis. This car was the result of a collaboration between young Rust Heinz (heir to the food industry tycoons Heinz) and the signing of bodywork Bohman & Schwartz. The mechanics of choice were the Cord 810 with a Lycoming V8 engine and front-wheel drive.
 The cabin was very luxurious by design, imitating art deco
 Doors had no handles and were electrically opened. Among other instruments there was an altimeter and a magnetic compass. A set of optical pilots indicated if the doors were not locked properly or if the radio receiver was turned on.
Manufacturing intentions were void of the death of promoter Rust Heinz in a car accident.

1939. Lagonda Rapide V12 Tulipwood Tourer

2006. Ferrari P4/5 by Pininfarina 
American James Glickenhaus commissioned Pininfarina to create a special P3 racing body. The mechanical base was the Ferrari Enzo. The result would be designated with the reference Ferrari P4/5 by Pininfarina, authorized by the Ferrari house.

Rolls-Royce Sweptail 
It was the costliest car in the world at its debut in 2017.

Motorcycles

1955. Guzzi Otto Cilindri 

The engine was a water-cooled 500cc V8. Two camshafts (4 trees in total) driven by a cascade of toothed wheels. It offered a power of 78 hp (58 kW) at 12000 rpm and weighed 45 kg. It was designed by the engineer Giulio Carcano.
The motorcycle broke the speed record with a speed of 280 km / h, a mark of would remain for 20 years.

1967. OSSA 250 Monocoque

1991. Britten V1000 

This New Zealand motorcycle with very unconventional solutions proved to be very competitive in racing. Apart from the initial prototype, ten units were built with noticeable differences.

Aircraft

1927. Spirit of Saint Louis.

1927. Dallas Spirit.

1940. Grumman XF5F-1 Skyrocket. 
Specially configured military twin-engine aircraft.

1947. H-4 Hercules Spruce Goose.

Airships

1984. White Dwarf Airship 
Human propulsion.

References 

Vehicles